Abu Tayur-e Yek (also Romanized as Abū Ţayūr-e Yek and Abū Ţeyūr-e Yek) is a village in Shoaybiyeh-ye Sharqi Rural District, Shadravan District, Shushtar County, Khuzestan Province, Iran. At the 2006 census, its population was 491, in 70 families.

References 

Populated places in Shushtar County